Elachista confirmata is a moth in the family Elachistidae. It was described by Edward Meyrick in 1931. It is found in southern India.

References

Moths described in 1931
confirmata
Moths of Asia